Substance intoxication is a transient condition of altered consciousness and behavior associated with recent use of a substance. It is often maladaptive and impairing, but reversible. If the symptoms are severe, the term "substance intoxication delirium" may be used.

Substance intoxication may often accompany a substance use disorder (SUD); if persistent substance-related problems exist, SUD is the preferred diagnosis.

The term "intoxicated", used by laymen, most often refers to alcohol.

Classification
The ICD-10  Mental and Behavioural Disorders due to psychoactive substance use shows:

F10. alcohol 
F11. opioids
F12. cannabinoids 
F13. sedatives and hypnotics 
F14. cocaine
F15. caffeine
F16. hallucinogens
F17. tobacco 
F18. volatile solvent
F19. multiple drug use and use of other psychoactive substances

Caffeine
The discussion over whether the coffee (caffeine) “buzz” counted as intoxication or not was hotly debated during the early to mid 16th century.

Contact high 
Contact high is a phenomenon that occurs in otherwise sober people who experience a drug-like effect just by coming into contact with someone who is under the influence of a psychoactive drug. In a similar way to the placebo effect, a contact high may be caused by classical conditioning as well as by the physical and social
setting.

The term is often incorrectly used to describe the high obtained from passive inhalation of marijuana.

Slang terms

Slang terms include: getting high (generic), being stoned, cooked, or blazed (usually in reference to cannabis), and many more specific slang terms for particular intoxicants. Alcohol intoxication is graded in intensity from buzzed, to tipsy  (all the way up to drunk, hammered, plastered, smashed, wasted, destroyed, shitfaced and a number of other terms). The term rolling is a common word used to describe being under the influence of MDMA and for LSD the phrases frying or tripping have been used. “Tripping” is a term that is considered applicable to virtually all hallucinogens which includes psychedelics,  dissociatives, deliriants and possibly certain types of hypnotics.

See also
"The spins", a state of dizziness and disorientation due to intoxication
Toxicity
Toxidrome

References

External links

 
Substance-related disorders